Vabalninkas is a city in the Biržai district municipality, Lithuania.

History

Vabalninkas village was mentioned in 1554, Vabalninkas estate in 1555. In 1593, Vabalninkas was assigned to Anne of Austria, wife of Sigismund III Vasa.
In 1617 first wooden church was built. Jeronimas Valavičius  Grand Treasurer of the Grand Duchy of Lithuania established a parish of Catholics, and a parish school. Since 1618 Vabalninkas is called a town, in 1619 Vabalninkas got a privilege to organise markets.

In 1625 Vabalninkas was devastated by the Swedish army and plague. In 1644 Vabalninkas inhabitants got a privilege to make and sell craft beer.

After the Soviet occupation Lithuanian partisans of Vytis military district were active, namely the Pilėnų tėvūnija (Pilėnai detachment).

Notable residents

 Mikhail Preobrazhensky (1854–1930), Russian architect
 Stefanija Ladigienė (1901–1967), ateitininkai activist, teacher, publicist, exile.
 Julius B. Maller (1901–1959), educator and sociologist
 Vladas Būtėnas (1923–1993), journalist, publicist.
 Edmundas Lapinskas (1936), agronomist, professor.
 Justas Tolvaišis (1954–2008), illustrator, graphic artist.
 Elazar Shach, rabbi.

 
Cities in Lithuania
Cities in Panevėžys County
Trakai Voivodeship
Ponevezhsky Uyezd
Biržai District Municipality